Jazzology Records is an American jazz record company and label. It is part of the Jazzology group of labels owned and operated by the George H. Buck Jr. Jazz Foundation.

Jazzology Records was founded in 1949 by George H. Buck, Jr. That year he recorded Art Hodes, Wild Bill Davison, and Tony Parenti. Buck didn't record again until 1954, when he created his GHB Records label to concentrate on Dixieland jazz. Over time he released music on other labels that he acquired: American Music Records, Audiophile, Black Swan, Circle, Progressive, Solo Art, and Southland.

Roster

 Red Allen
 Donald Ashwander
 Jimmy Archey
 Kenny Ball
 Sidney Bechet
 Barney Bigard
 George Brunies
 Billy Butterfield
 Ernie Carson
 Sid Catlett
 Doc Cheatham
 Evan Christopher
 Bill Coleman
 Eddie Condon
 Kenny Davern
 Wild Bill Davison
 Baby Dodds
 Don Ewell
 Pops Foster
 Pete Fountain
 Bud Freeman
 Marty Grosz
 Bobby Hackett
 Bob Haggart
 Edmond Hall
 Herb Hall
 Chuck Hedges
 Duke Heitger
 Earl Hines
 Art Hodes
 Max Kaminsky
 Tim Laughlin
 Yank Lawson
 Cliff Leeman
 George Lewis
 Jimmy McPartland
 Eddie Miller
 Miff Mole
 Max Morath
 Red Nichols
 Tony Parenti
 Ed Polcer
 Ben Pollack
 Trevor Richards
 Tom Roberts
 Pee Wee Russell
 Randy Sandke
 Bob Scobey
 Zutty Singleton
 Willie "The Lion" Smith
 Muggsy Spanier
 Jess Stacy
 Rex Stewart
 Ralph Sutton
 Jack Teagarden
 Butch Thompson
 Warren Vaché Sr.
 Warren Vaché Jr.
 Dicky Wells
 George Wettling
 Bob Wilber
 Teddy Wilson
 World's Greatest Jazz Band
 Knocky Parker

References

American record labels
Jazz record labels
Record labels established in 1949